Synchiropus kiyoae, Kiyo's dragonet, is a species of dragonet native to the Pacific Ocean where it occurs around Japan and has been seen around Hawaii. This species grows to a length of  SL.

Etymology
The specific name honours Mrs.Kiyoe Tanaka, the widow of Tatsuo Tanaka, who donated land, facilities, and her personal time for to help establish the Tatsuo Tanaka Memorial Biological Station on Miyake-jima, Japan. It is considered by some authorities to be the only species in the monospecific genus Minysynchiropus but most authorities place it within the genus Synchiropus.

References

kiyoae
Taxa named by Ronald Fricke
Taxa named by Martha Janet Zaiser Brownell
Fish described in 1983